"Liber OZ" (or "Book 77") is a single page by English author and occultist Aleister Crowley purporting to declare mankind's basic and intrinsic rights according to Crowley's philosophy of Thelema. Written in 1941 (though based on a much earlier O.T.O. initiation lecture), the work consists of five succinct and concise paragraphs, being one of the last and shortest of Crowley's many "libri," or books.

Crowley wrote the piece for Louis Wilkinson in order to convey as simply as possible the "O.T.O. plan in words of one syllable" broken down into "five sections: moral, bodily, mental, sexual, and the safeguard tyrannicide...".

See also
Libri of Aleister Crowley

References

External links
Full text of Liber OZ (Book 77)

Ordo Templi Orientis
Thelemite texts
Works by Aleister Crowley